Lincoln Township is one of thirty-seven townships in Washington County, Arkansas, USA. As of the 2000 census, its total population was 1,752.

Geography
Lincoln Township is almost entirely engulfed by Starr Hill Township, with a very brief portion adjacent to Cane Hill Township.

Cities, towns, villages
Lincoln

Cemeteries
The township contains Bean Cemetery, one of the National Register of Historic Places listings in Washington County, Arkansas.

Major routes
 U.S. Route 62

References

 United States Census Bureau 2008 TIGER/Line Shapefiles

External links
 US-Counties.com
 City-Data.com

Townships in Washington County, Arkansas
Townships in Arkansas